The 1999-2000 season was the 43rd season in RK Zamet’s history. It is their 8th successive season in the 1. A HRL, and 23rd successive top tier season.

First team squad

Goalkeeper
1  Diego Modrušan
12   Igor Saršon
16  Valter Matošević (captain)

Wingers
RW
 7  Dean Ožbolt
 11  Igor Rožman

LW
 6  Danijel Riđić
 10   Bojan Pezelj

Line players
3  Renato Sulić
 11  Mirjan Horvat
 19  Adnan Kamberović

Back players
LB
10  Andrej Jurić
15  Borna Franić

CB
8  Igor Gmaz
 13  Edin Bašić
 18  Ivica Grga

RB
 4  Milan Uzelac
 5  Silvio Ivandija 
 9  Ivan Vukas

Technical staff 
  President: Marko Markanović
  Sports director: Boris Konjuh
  Club Secretary: Senka Glušević
  Head Coach: Ivan Munitić (until 10 Oct 1999)
  Head Coach: Damir Čavlović (from 10 Oct 1999)
  Assistant  Coach: Milan Rončević (until 10 Oct 1999)
  Assistant Coach: Sergio DePrivitellio (from 10 Oct 1999)
  Fizioterapist: Zlatko Kolić
  Tehniko: Goran Segarić

Competitions

Overall

EHF City Cup

Matches

1.A HRL

First phase

League table

Matches

Second phase

Table

Matches

Third phase

Relegation play-offs

Matches

Croatian Cup

Matches

References

External links
HRS
Sport.net.hr
Rk-zamet.hr

RK Zamet seasons
Handball in Croatia